Neil John Lenham (born 17 December 1965) is a former English cricketer who played for Sussex and captained the England Under-19 cricket team in 3 Tests and 3 ODIs earlier in his career. He was born in Worthing.

Lenham played 192 first-class matches during his career, scoring 10,135 runs at an average of 33.44 in the process. He made 20 centuries with the highest being an unbeaten 222. With the ball, Lenham took 42 first-class wickets at an average of 43.97 with a best of 4 for 13.

In List A cricket he made 3,207 runs at an average of 31.13 with one century, an innings of 129 not out. He took 44 wickets at average of 31.59 with a best of 5 for 28.

After retiring from playing, Lenham took up coaching. He coached the Namibian national team at the 1997 ICC Trophy in Malaysia.

References

External links
 Cricinfo Profile

Living people
1965 births
English cricketers
Sussex cricketers
Sportspeople from Worthing
English cricket coaches
British expatriates in Namibia
Coaches of the Namibia national cricket team